The Varsity Show is one of the oldest traditions at Columbia University and its oldest performing arts presentation. Founded in 1894 as a fundraiser for the university's fledgling athletic teams, the Varsity Show now draws together the entire Columbia undergraduate community for a series of sold-out performances every April. Dedicated to producing a unique full-length spectacle that skewers and satirizes many dubious aspects of life at Columbia, the Varsity Show is written and inspired by an extensive team of cast, producers and production personnel.

Notable alumni

Alumni who have written, performed, directed, worked backstage, or otherwise been associated with the show include:

 Kenneth MacKenzie Murchison, 1894, architect
Henry Shrady, 1894, architect
 Guy Wetmore Carryl, 1895, author and humorist
Melville Henry Cane, 1900, lawyer and poet
 William C. DeMille, 1900, president of the Academy of Motion Picture Arts and Sciences 
 John Erskine, 1900, pioneer of the Great Books program 
 Edgar Allan Woolf, 1901, co-screenwriter of The Wizard of Oz 
 Arthur Garfield Hays, 1902, who represented the American Civil Liberties Union at the Monkey Trial of John Scopes 
George Middleton, 1902, president of the Dramatists Guild of America
 Ralph Morgan, 1904, the first president of the Screen Actors Guild 
Frank D. Fackenthal, 1906, acting President of Columbia University 
Kenneth Webb, 1906, film director 
 Roy Webb, 1910, composer for scores of films, including Abe Lincoln in Illinois, Notorious, and Marty 
 Dixon Ryan Fox, 1911, president of Union College 
 Oscar Hammerstein II, 1916, legendary lyricist
 Howard Dietz, 1917, lyricist for Dancing in the Dark and head of publicity for MGM, who created its famed Leo the Lion trademark 
 Herman Mankiewicz, 1917, who with Orson Welles wrote Citizen Kane 
 Lorenz Hart, 1918, lyricist of "My Funny Valentine", "Bewitched, Bothered and Bewildered" and many other Broadway standards
 Corey Ford, 1923, humorist who named Eustace Tilley, the mascot of The New Yorker magazine
 Richard Rodgers, 1923, legendary songwriter
 Jacques Barzun, 1927, cultural historian
 Albert Maltz, 1930, one of the Hollywood Ten and screenwriter for Destination Tokyo 
 William Ludwig, 1932, screenwriter for The Great Caruso and Oscar co-winner for Interrupted Melody 
 Herman Wouk, 1934, Pulitzer Prize-winning author of The Caine Mutiny and Marjorie Morningstar 
 Martin Manulis, 1935, television producer and creator of Playhouse 90 
Carl Emil Schorske, 1936, Pulitzer Prize-winning historian 
 John La Touche, 1937, lyricist for Cabin in the Sky and The Golden Apple 
 Robert Lax, 1938, minimalist poet
 Sid Luckman, 1939, Chicago Bears quarterback
 I.A.L. Diamond, 1941, Oscar-winning screenwriter; Billy Wilder's co-author on The Apartment and The Fortune Cookie
 Gerald Green, 1942, writer of Holocaust
Ernest Kinoy, 1946, screenwriter
 Edward N. Costikyan, 1947, political advisor
 Dick Hyman, 1948, Emmy-award winning composer
 Sorrell Booke, 1949, actor who played Boss Hogg in The Dukes of Hazzard 
 Philip Springer, 1950, American composer who wrote the Christmas song, Santa Baby
 Edward Kleban, 1959, lyricist for A Chorus Line 
 Terrence McNally, 1960, Tony Award-winning playwright
 Jon Bauman, 1969, of Sha Na Na 
 Adam Belanoff, 1984, a writer/producer of Wings, Murphy Brown, Cosby, and The Closer 
 Alexa Junge, Barnard College 1986, an Emmy-nominated writer/producer of Friends and The West Wing 
 David Rakoff, 1986, comedic essayist
 Alex Kuczynski, Barnard College 1990, Styles reporter for The New York Times 
 Eric Garcetti, 1992, mayor of Los Angeles 
 Tom Kitt, 1996, Tony Award-winning composer of Next To Normal 
 Donna Vivino, Barnard College 2000, actress in Wicked 
Lang Fisher, 2002, co-creator of Never Have I Ever and Peabody Award winner
Will Graham, 2002, co-creator of Onion News Network and Peabody Award winner
Brandon Victor Dixon, 2002, Tony Award-winning and Emmy Award-nominated actor 
Robby Mook, 2002, campaign manager for Hillary Clinton's 2016 presidential campaign 
Susanna Fogel, 2002, Directors Guild of America Awards-winning director  
 Kelly McCreary, Barnard College 2003, actress on Grey's Anatomy
Tze Chun, 2003, director 
Peter Koechley, 2003, co-founder of Upworthy and former managing editor of The Onion
Gabe Liedman, 2004, creator of Q-Force
 Jenny Slate, 2004, cast member, Saturday Night Live
 Greta Gerwig, Barnard College 2006, Golden Globe and Oscars-nominated director 
 Kate McKinnon, 2006, actress on Saturday Night Live and The Big Gay Sketch Show

The I.A.L. Diamond Award for Achievement in the Arts
The I.A.L. Diamond Award is presented on annual basis to a Columbia or Barnard alumnus/a who has demonstrated continued commitment to and has found success in the arts. I. A. L. Diamond (1920–88) is the only individual to have written four consecutive Varsity Shows. He then went on to Hollywood to write eleven screenplays with Billy Wilder for the latter's films, including Some Like it Hot (1959) and The Apartment (1960). Diamond and Wilder won the 1960 Academy Award for Best Original Screenplay for The Apartment.

In 2004, Terrence McNally was the first recipient of the award. McNally graduated Phi Beta Kappa from Columbia College with a B.A. in English in 1960 and went on to author works such as Master Class, Love! Valour! Compassion!, and Ragtime. During his senior year at Columbia, McNally wrote the 66th Annual Varsity Show, which featured music by fellow student Edward Kleban (who would later share the Pulitzer Prize for A Chorus Line) and was directed by Michael Kahn (later the artistic director of the Shakespeare Theatre Company in Washington, D.C.).

In 2005, Jeanine Tesori, Barnard College Class of 1983, was honored with the award. Ms. Tesori was the music director for the 89th Annual Varsity Show and then came back a year in 1984 to write the music for the 90th Annual Varsity Show. She is a three-time Tony Award nominee for her work on Twelfth Night (1998, Lincoln Center), Thoroughly Modern Millie, and Caroline, or Change.

In 2006, Art Garfunkel, Columbia College Class of 1962, received the award. Garfunkel is best known as half of the folk duo Simon and Garfunkel.

In 2007, Brandon V. Dixon, member of the Columbia College community, received the award. Mr. Dixon performed in the cast of the 107th Annual Varsity Show. He later received a Tony Award nomination for his performance of Harpo in The Color Purple. He also originated the role of Simba in the national tour of The Lion King.

In 2008, the award was presented to Tom Kitt (CC '96) and Brian Yorkey (CC '93). For their musical Next To Normal, featuring music by Kitt and book/lyrics by Yorkey, the pair won the 2009 Tony Award for Best Original Score and the 2010 Pulitzer Prize for Drama. While at Columbia, the duo wrote the music, lyrics, and book to the 100th Annual Varsity Show, Angels at Columbia: Centennial Approaches.

In 2009, the award was presented to Diane Paulus, a teacher at Barnard College, Columbia School of the Arts graduate, and, most recently, director of the Tony-winning revival of Hair.

In 2010, the award was presented to Twyla Tharp, a Barnard College '63 alumna. She is the choreographer of many famous dances, multiple Broadway shows, and the film version of the musical Hair and has won a Tony and an Emmy.

Past Varsity Shows

 1894: Joan of Arc
 1896: The Buccaneer
 1897: Cleopatra
 1899: Varsity Show
 1900: The Governor's Vrouw
 1901: The Princess Proud
 1902: The Vanity Fair
 1903: The Mischief Maker
 1904: The Isle of Illusia
 1905: The Khan of Kathan
 1906: The Conspirators
 1907: The Ides of March
 1908: Mr. King
 1909: In Newport
 1910: The King of Hilaria
 1911: Made in India
 1912: The Mysterious Miss Apache
 1913: The Brigands
 1914: The Merry Lunatic
 1915: On Your Way
 1916: The Peace Pirates
 1917: Home, James
 1918: Ten for Five
 1919: Take a Chance
 1920: Fly with Me
 1921: You'll Never Know
 1922: Steppe Around
 1923: Half Moon Inn
 1924: Old King's
 1925: Half Moon Inn (revival)
 1926: His Majesty, The Queen
 1927: Betty Behave
 1928: Zuleika, or the Sultan Insulted
 1929: Oh, Hector
 1930: Heigh-ho Pharaoh
 1931: Great Shakes
 1932: How Revolting!
 1933: Home, James
 1934: Laugh it Off!
 1935: Flair-Flair: The Idol of Paree
 1936: Off Your Marx
 1937: Some of the People
 1938: You've Got Something There
 1939: Fair Enough
 1940: Life Begins in '40
 1941: Hit the Road
 1942: Saints Alive
 1944: On the Double
 1945: Second the Motion
 1946: Step Right Up
 1947: Dead to Rights
 1948: Streets of New York
 1949: Mr. Oscar
 1950: Wait For It
 1951: Babe in the Woods
 1952: Streets of New York (revival)
 1953: Shape of Things
 1954: Sky's the Limit
 1955: When in Rome
 1956: Not Fit to Print
 1957: The Voice of the Sea
 1958: Streets of New York (revival)
 1959: Dig That Treasure
 1960: A Little Bit Different
 1961: Streets of New York (revival)
 1963: Elsinore
 1964: Il Troubleshootore
 1965: Destry Rides Again
 1966: The Bawd's Opera
 1967: Feathertop
 1978: The Great Columbia Riot of '78
 1980: Fly With Me (revival)
 1982: College on Broadway
 1982: Columbia Graffiti
 1983: Fear of Scaffolding
 1984: The New 'U'
 1985: Lost in Place
 1987: From Here to Uncertainty
 1988: The Bonfire of Humanities
 1989: Sans Souci, Be Happy
 1990: Behind the Lion Curtain
 1991: The Silence of the Lions
 1992: Columbia U, 10027
 1993: The Lion Game
 1994: Angels at Columbia: Centennial Approaches
 1995: Step Inside
 1996: Devil in a Light Blue Dress
 1997: Enlargement and Enhancement: The Scaffolding Years
 1998: Love is Indefinite
 1999: Beyond Oedipus: Leaving the Womb
 2000: Mo' Money, Mo' Problems
 2001: Sex, Lions, and Videotape
 2002: 108th Annual Varsity Show
 2003: Dial 'D' for Deadline
 2004: Off-Broadway
 2005: The Sound of Muses
 2006: Misery Loves Columbia
 2007: Insufficient Funds
 2008: Morningside Hates
 2009: The Gates of Wrath
 2010: College Walk of Shame
 2011: Another Scandal!
 2012: The Corporate Core
 2013: The Great Netscape
 2014: Morningside Nights
 2015: Almageddon
 2016: A King's College 
 2017: A Tale of Two Colleges 
 2018: Lights Out on Broadway
 2019: It’s a Wonderful Strife
 2020: We Hope This Musical Finds You Well
 2021: Campus in the Cloud
 2022: Well Endowed

References

External links
 "Sing a Song of Morningside", an official history of the show by Thomas Vinciguerra
The Varsity Show – Official Page

Further reading
Rohrs, Ali. "113th Varsity Show Cast Announced" Columbia Spectator. (November 22, 2006)
Lipkin, Suzanne. "Homer Hosts the Varsity Show" Columbia Spectator. (April 21, 2005)
Putnam, Ashley. "I'm Sorry Mr. Jackson, This Show Was for Real" Columbia Spectator. (April 22, 2004)
Russo, Jax. "110th Annual Varsity Show" Columbia Spectator. (April 15, 2004)
Greenwell, Megan. "Frosted Phallus: Varsity Show Serves Up Provocative Pastry" Columbia Spectator. (November 14, 2003)
Cusick, Colleen. "Varsity Show: An Evolving Tradition" Columbia Spectator. (April 24, 2003)
Russo, Jax. "109th Varsity Show, Dial "D" for Deadline, Opens Friday" Columbia Spectator. (April 10, 2003)
Fitzner, Ana. "Varsity Show Reach Exceeds Its Grasp" Columbia Spectator. (May 3, 2002)
Russo, Jax. "Varsity Show 2002 Ready to Rock" Columbia Spectator. (April 25, 2002)

Culture of Columbia University
Traditions by university or college in the United States
Recurring events established in 1894